Parkmore is a suburb of Johannesburg, South Africa. It is located in Region B of the City of Johannesburg Metropolitan Municipality.

History
It was established as a suburb in 1907 and takes its name from two farms, Hurl Park and Benmore Farm.

References

Johannesburg Region B